The Play-offs of the 2008 Fed Cup Europe/Africa Zone Group II were the final stages of the Group II Zonal Competition involving teams from Europe and Africa. Using the positions determined in their pools, the seven teams faced off to determine their placing in the 2008 Fed Cup Europe/Africa Zone Group II. The top two teams advanced to Group I, and the bottom two teams were relegated down to the Group III for the next year.

Promotion play-offs
The top two teams of each pool were placed against each other in two head-to-head rounds. The winner of the rounds advanced to Group I for next year.

Bosnia and Herzegovina vs. Lithuania

South Africa vs. Estonia

Relegation play-offs
Because there was one extra player in Pool B, the last-placed team of that pool was automatically relegated down to Group III. The third-placed teams of each pool were then placed against each other in a tie, where the losing team would join the Irish in relegation.

Turkey vs. Greece

Final Placements

  and  advanced to the Europe/Africa Zone Group I for the next year. The Bosnians and Herzegovinians placed twelfth overall, while the Estonians placed first and thus advanced to the World Group II play-offs.
The Greeks thus advanced back to Group II for 2010.

See also
Fed Cup structure

References

External links
 Fed Cup website

2008 Fed Cup Europe/Africa Zone